Como Lake Park is a small park in Coquitlam, British Columbia. Como Lake is located in the centre of the park and is surrounded by a one-kilometre-long trail.

References

External links 
 

Parks in Coquitlam
Urban public parks in Canada